Christopher Horner  (born 1955) is an American anthropologist and scenic designer.

Biography

Horner was born in 1955 in Los Angeles. Before graduating high school, he had already studied anthropology and been involved in exchange programs on Hopi Reservations. Graduating from UC Berkeley in 1976 with a degree in architecture and environmental design, he accepted a job with MGM as a set designer. He worked on films such as Winter Kills, Comes a Horseman, Altered States, The Jazz Singer and the Emmy-award-winning Friendly Fire for CBS, among many others. His work on "The Jazz Singer" was alongside his father, Art Director Harry Horner. His older brother was film score composer James Horner.

In the late 80's, Horner began directing commercials for European Television Company (ETC) among various other directing assignments. Following his involvement in the creation of L'Association Jour de la Terre (the French Earth Day environmental organization), he returned to California in 1992 to design the film Miracle Mile and has since done extensive design and special-effects consulting for a variety of film and television projects. He continues writing, directing, and producing a number of TV programs in the States and abroad.

In addition, Horner works as a partner in Cinetransformer International, a Mexico City-based manufacturer and operator of mobile digital movie theatres which bring movies and educational services to underserved communities in developing nations. He is developing a documentary series exploring how the world can benefit by transitioning to a new economic paradigm where environmental cost is incorporated into the equation.

His most recent film, The Disappearing of Tuvalu: Trouble In Paradise, documents the devastating effects of global warming on the tiny South Pacific country of Tuvalu.

References

Chris Horner is a graduate of Verde Valley School, an international boarding school in Sedona, Arizona.

Related filmmakers
Tim Asch
John Marshall
Robert Gardner

External links 
 Small Is Beautiful: Filmmaker Profile

1955 births
Living people
American anthropologists
American people of Austrian-Jewish descent
American people of Hungarian-Jewish descent
American scenic designers
American television directors
Artists from Los Angeles
Jewish American social scientists
UC Berkeley College of Environmental Design alumni
Visual anthropologists
Film directors from Los Angeles
21st-century American Jews